Isabella Bryld Obaze (born 30 October 2002) is a Danish footballer who plays as a defender for Elitedivisionen club HB Køge. In 2022 she was called up to the senior Denmark national team.

International career
Obaze was born in Denmark and is of Nigerian descent. She is a youth international for Denmark. She participated at the 2019 UEFA Under-17 European Championship in Bulgaria. Obaze most recently played for the Denmark national under-19 team at the 2020 La Manga Tournament.

References

External links
Profile at Danish Football Association 
 
 
 

2002 births
Living people
People from Kolding
Danish women's footballers
Women's association football defenders
Danish people of Nigerian descent
People of Igbo descent
HB Køge (women) players
Sportspeople from the Region of Southern Denmark
Denmark women's international footballers
Denmark international footballers
Association football defenders